Tunman Wood is a local nature reserve with an area of over  located near Eagle Barnsdale, Lincolnshire. It is an area of ancient woodland and has existed since at least 1774. It was used by the Forestry Commission from the 1940s until it was purchased by Lincolnshire County Council, North Kesteven District Council and Lincolnshire Wildlife Trust from Lafarge Aggregates in February 2009.

References

Local Nature Reserves in Lincolnshire
Tourist attractions in Lincolnshire
Lincolnshire Wildlife Trust
Forests and woodlands of Lincolnshire